The Japan Australia Migratory Bird Agreement (JAMBA) is a treaty between Australia and Japan to minimise harm to the major areas used by birds which migrate between the two countries.  JAMBA was first developed on February 6, 1974 and came into force on April 30, 1981.

JAMBA provides for cooperation between Japan and Australia on measures for the management and protection of migratory birds, birds in danger of extinction, and the management and protection of their environments, and requires each country to take appropriate measures to preserve and enhance the environment of birds protected under the provisions of the agreement.

Listed species 
The treaty lists 66 species of birds, as per the table below.

See also
 Convention on Biological Diversity
 List of international environmental agreements
 Environment Protection and Biodiversity Conservation Act 1999
 China–Australia Migratory Bird Agreement
Republic of Korea–Australia Migratory Bird Agreement
 Bonn Convention
 East Asian – Australasian Flyway

References

External links
JAMBA text - Austlii

Nature conservation in Australia
Australia
Environmental treaties
Migratory Bird Agreement
Treaties concluded in 1974
Treaties entered into force in 1981
Treaties of Japan
Australia–Japan relations
Bird conservation
1981 in the environment
Animal treaties
1981 establishments in Australia
1974 in Australian law
Bird migration